River piracy may refer to:
 River pirate
 River capture